The Main Line (or Erie Main Line) is a commuter rail line owned and operated by New Jersey Transit running from Suffern, New York to Hoboken, New Jersey, in the United States. It runs daily commuter service and was once the north–south main line of the Erie Railroad. It is colored yellow on NJ Transit system maps, and its symbol is a water wheel.

The Bergen County Line splits off the Main Line just west of the Secaucus Junction transfer station and rejoins it at Ridgewood. Trains on both lines are push-pull, powered by diesel locomotives (ordinarily on the west end of the train).

History
The Erie Railroad's main line ran from Jersey City to Chicago via Binghamton and Jamestown, New York, Akron and Marion, Ohio, and Huntington, Indiana, with branches to Buffalo, Cleveland, and Dayton. The section in New Jersey and lower New York State saw frequent commuter service to the waterfront Pavonia Terminal, Jersey City, with connections to the Pavonia Ferry to Lower Manhattan.

The Erie Railroad's major long-distance passenger trains to Chicago, the Atlantic Express and Pacific Express, the Erie Limited, and the Lake Cities, ran along this section, through Passaic, Paterson, Ridgewood, on to Port Jervis, northwest to Binghamton, New York State's Southern Tier, Jamestown, and west to Chicago. The final long-distance train along this route was the Atlantic Express and Pacific Express in 1965. 

In 1963, the Erie Main Line south of Paterson to its connection with the Bergen County Line at Carlton Hill in Rutherford was abandoned and service began using the former Lackawanna Boonton Branch south of Paterson via the Lyndhurst Draw and Upper Hack Lift bridges as the route through downtown Passaic was abandoned. Boonton Line service began using the Erie's Greenwood Lake division up to its junction the Lackawanna Boonton Branch at Mountain View in Wayne as the Lackawanna right-of-way in Paterson was used for the construction of Interstate 80. The Erie Jersey City terminal was abandoned circa 1959 after all Erie service had moved to the Lackawanna Hoboken Terminal.

Service under Erie Lackawanna introduced new GE U34CH diesels and Comet I cars in 1970 which lasted under NJ DOT and Conrail into the NJ Transit era. Metro-North took over service north of Suffern in 1983. Effective April 18, 1983, Metro-North Railroad shifted its Port Jervis Line service to run on the Graham Line, thus ending the direct passenger route from Harriman through Monroe and Goshen to Middletown. Service was increased along with the opening of the Secaucus Transfer station in late 2003.

1996 Secaucus collision 
On February 9, 1996, a Main Line train was involved in a collision with a Bergen County Line train in Secaucus.

Service
Departing the historic 1907-built Hoboken Terminal, the yards for the coaches to the left, trains pass over two city streets and the Hudson Bergen Light Rail before entering the Bergen Tunnels under the Bergen Hill section of Hudson Palisades. Midway through the tunnel there are air shafts allowing light through and venting out the diesel fumes. Exiting the tunnel, the train curves right onto the Main Line at West End interlocking in Jersey City. Until 1963 this was the DL&W Boonton Branch; about a mile ahead was the connection built circa 1956 with the Erie main line (that after 1963 became the Bergen County Line). Two trains collided head-on here in 1996, killing two engineers and a passenger. The ramps for New Jersey Turnpike Interchange 15X now occupy the Erie alignment-- since the Bergen County line was rerouted adjacent to the Main Line to pass through Secaucus Junction.

At Secaucus Junction, all trains stop for passengers to change to and from Northeast Corridor Line, North Jersey Coast Line, Raritan Valley Line and Midtown Direct trains on the Morristown Line, the Gladstone Branch, and the Montclair-Boonton Line on the upper level.

The Main Line then runs through an industrial section of Secaucus. Shortly afterwards the Bergen County Line curves right on its new connection to the Erie alignment. The Main Line then crosses over the Hackensack River on the single-track Upper Hack Lift bridge, built in 1958.

Double track resumes under the New Jersey Turnpike's western spur after 0.4 mile of single track. The train continues through the Meadowlands and passes the first grade crossing at Valley Brook Avenue in Lyndhurst. The line curves slightly and passes through the 1903 Kingsland tunnel. Kingsland station is shortly after the tunnel in an open cut. Just beyond Kingsland station is Lyndhurst station, on an embankment.

After Lyndhurst the train crosses the Passaic River on a swing bridge that has been bolted shut (although it is technically required by Federal regulation to be opened on 24 hours notice). The train passes under Route 3 and approaches Delawanna station.

Next stop is Passaic, on an embankment. After Passaic, the Main Line has a stretch through some industrial areas before the Clifton station, also on an embankment.

The Main Line passes under U.S. Route 46 and the Garden State Parkway before it crosses under and over several streets in south Paterson. This connection was single track when built circa 1963, then double-tracked in a rehabilitation project in 2002. The line passes under Interstate 80 and heads into downtown Paterson. The Erie station in Paterson is elevated, with a center platform.

Continuing north the Main Line is elevated through Paterson, passing over streets. After several grade crossings in an industrial area, the tracks cross the Passaic River on a truss bridge. Hawthorne is the next stop, at grade level. After a long stretch, the train reaches Glen Rock station, at grade level at a crossing.

After Glen Rock the Main Line merges with the Bergen County Line at Ridgewood Junction. The line widens to three tracks (in Erie days the line was four tracks from here to Suffern NY). Ridgewood station is next, with Spanish-style design on the station building and with newly constructed high-level platforms.

Next is Ho-Ho-Kus, also at grade. Waldwick follows with an abandoned station building on the northbound side and a footbridge connecting the two platforms. Waldwick Yard is just north of the station with the restored WC tower on the southbound side by the yard. Just following Waldwick Yard is a grade crossing. North of the grade crossing (which has three tracks) the line becomes two tracks.

Allendale and Ramsey follow, both as grade-level stations. Ramsey-Route 17 station (opened August 22, 2004) is next. It is a park-and-ride facility located off of Route 17 south in Ramsey.

Mahwah follows and is the last station in New Jersey. Crossing over the New York state line the train arrives at Suffern, the last stop for most trains. Some trains continue via Metro-North's Port Jervis Line to the north end of passenger operations at Port Jervis. The yards are just to the north of the Suffern station, under the New York State Thruway overpass.

Rolling stock
All trains on the Main Line are push-pulled by diesel locomotives. Coaches used are from the Comet series, and often feature Metro-North owned Comet Vs as these are pooled with New Jersey Transit's coaches as part of the operating agreement. Trains running exclusively on NJT trackage may also utilize MultiLevel cars hauled by a PL42AC. More recently, ALP-45DP hauled trains have been used on this line as well. Other equipment used could also include EMD GP40PH-2 or EMD GP40PH-2B locomotives.

Stations

References

Bibliography

External links
 New Jersey Transit

 
NJ Transit Rail Operations
Rail infrastructure in New Jersey
Transportation in Bergen County, New Jersey
Transportation in Rockland County, New York
Rail lines in Rockland County, New York